Samuel Mitchell Holmes Sr. (December 11, 1915–November 8, 2010), was an American baseball player. He played in the Negro leagues for the Monroe Monarchs (though it is assumed he played for them after they left the major Negro Southern League following 1932), and the Denver White Elephants, a semi-professional team.

He was born in Bosco, Louisiana.

References

1915 births
2010 deaths
People from Ouachita Parish, Louisiana
Baseball players from Louisiana
Monroe Monarchs players
20th-century African-American sportspeople
21st-century African-American people